Kanlayanee Si Thammarat School is a high school in Nakhon Si Thammarat located in Thailand which was established in 1918 as a provincial girls' school.
#กัลคอน #เสรีทรงผม

Curriculum 
This school has 3 programs of study:
 Normal Program
 English Program (EP)
 Science and Mathematics Gifted Program (SMGP)

School colors are white and blue. School's tree is ratchapreuk. School motto is: Wisdom is the light of the world.

References

External links 
 

Schools in Thailand
Educational institutions established in 1912
Nakhon Si Thammarat province